Project Dolphin is an Indian government initiative to conserve both riverine and oceanic dolphin species launched in 2021. The project was announced on 15 August 2020 during the 74th independence day celebrations by Indian prime minister Narendra Modi. It is under the Wildlife Institute of India, an autonomous body of the Ministry of Environment, Forest and Climate Change. It is modelled on Project Tiger. Demands were made for a Project Dolphin for India in 2019. October 5th has also been designated as "National Dolphin Day" by the environment ministry. A dolphin breeding centre for the Gangetic river dolphin is planned for the Bengal region, specifically the stretch of the Ganges river between Farakka and Gangasagar, already home to 650 dolphins. India's dolphins are at risk of extinct due to a variety of factors, namely: strandings in canal systems, constructions of waterways, unchecked fishing activity using nylon nets, noise pollution from ships, amidsts other factors. The project has been criticized by Gajendra Singh Shekhawat for its slow pace of work.

See also 

 South Asian river dolphin
 Ganges river dolphin
 Indus river dolphin
 Makara – water creature from Hindu mythology that is sometimes depicted dolphin-like
 Project Tiger
 Project Elephant

References 

Wildlife conservation in India
Conservation projects